Jiangda, also Jamda or Jagda is a township of Sog County in the Nagqu Prefecture of the Tibet Autonomous Region of China. As of 2010 it had a population of 3,155 people.

History
The township was established in 1966, and in 1988 it merged with the former Kedeng Township to form Jiangda Township. In 2007, there were 493 households with 3,087 people. As of 2010 it had a population of  3,155.

Geography

Economy and administration
In 2007, the total area under cultivation was  228.39 hectares and there were 14,368 horses. The township has jurisdiction over 11 villages, including Jiangda itself.

Landmarks
There are two temples in the township: Dongzong Temple and Jiangda Temple.

References

Populated places in Nagqu
Township-level divisions of Tibet